The surname Monaghan is a family name originating from the province of Connacht in Ireland. Mostly a last name.

Origins

The surname Monaghan is an anglicization of the Irish surname O'Manacháin . The Irish translation for this name is descendant of Manacháin, which ultimately translates to "Monk". Other variations include Monahan and Monachan.

Essentially, sometime before the 16th century, the Connacht family derived the name Monahan from the infamous warrior Manacháin mentioned by the Four Masters at the year 866. The O'Manacháin clan were chiefs of Ui Briuin na Sionna in the barony of Ballintober, Co. Roscommon, until the year 1249 when they were ousted by the O'Beirnes.

Although they share the same spelling, the surname Monaghan is not related to County Monaghan, Ireland, whose name is derived from the Irish Muineachán. Muineachán (Muinechán, Mhuineachain) means "a place abounding in little hills" or "little shrubbery" from muine, a shrubbery, with the diminutive affix cán.

The surname is however the source for County Fermanagh, Northern Ireland, which means "Place of the Men of Manacháin."

Variations

Due to the recent standardisation of the English language, many Gaelic surnames transliterated into English have multiple spelling variations. The surname Monahan is a variant of the surname Monaghan.

Famous Monaghans
 Cameron Monaghan, actor
 Carol Monaghan, Scottish National Party politician
 Dominic Monaghan, actor
 Joel Monaghan, Australian rugby league player
 Jonathan Monaghan, visual artist
 Michelle Monaghan, actress
 Patrick Monahan, singer
 Úna Monaghan, harpist
 William Monahan, screenwriter and novelist
 Jon-Michael Monaghan, Professional Wrestler

Development

A census conducted in 1890 of Ireland states that an estimated 4,300 Irish citizens bear the name Monaghan.

English-language surnames
Surnames of Irish origin
Anglicised Irish-language surnames